Tumbleweed Connection is the third studio album by English singer-songwriter Elton John. It was recorded at Trident Studios, London, England in March 1970, and released in October 1970 in the United Kingdom and January 1971 in the United States. It is a concept album based on country and western/Americana themes. All songs are written by John and Bernie Taupin, with the exception of "Love Song" by Lesley Duncan.

In 2012, Tumbleweed Connection was ranked number 458 on Rolling Stone magazine's list of the 500 greatest albums of all time. The album peaked at number two on the UK Albums Chart and number five on the US Billboard 200 chart. In the US, it was certified gold in March 1971 and platinum in August 1998 by the RIAA.

Background
Co-writer Bernie Taupin said of the album, "Everybody thinks that I was influenced by Americana and by seeing America first hand, but we wrote and recorded the album before we'd even been to the States. It was totally influenced by The Band's album, 'Music From Big Pink', and Robbie Robertson's songs. I've always loved Americana, and I loved American Westerns. I've always said that 'El Paso' was the song that made me want to write songs, it was the perfect meshing of melody and storyline, and I thought that here was something that married rhythms and the written word completely." John has remarked, "Lyrically and melodically, that's probably one of our most perfect albums. I don't think there's any song on there that doesn't melodically fit the lyric."

Basic tracks for three of the album's titles, "Come Down in Time", "Country Comfort" and "Burn Down the Mission", were recorded at Trident during the sessions for the previous LP, Elton John, with overdubs completed for Tumbleweed Connection.  An early version of "Madman Across the Water", featuring Mick Ronson on electric guitar, was also recorded during the sessions for the album. It was released on several albums and reissues of Tumbleweed Connection, though the track was ultimately re-recorded for the Madman Across the Water album.

Dee Murray and Nigel Olsson appear for the first time together on this album as the rhythm section on "Amoreena". Olsson had played on one track on Empty Sky for John in 1969. It is Murray's first appearance on an Elton John album. In addition to several studio players who also performed on John's previous self-titled second album, several tracks feature backing musicians from the band Hookfoot, who were also his DJM Records label mates. Hookfoot guitarist Caleb Quaye and drummer Roger Pope had also appeared on John's Empty Sky album.

No singles were released from the album in the US by either DJM or John's US distributor, Universal Records, but "Country Comfort" (b/w "Love Song") was released as a single in Australia, New Zealand and Brazil.

Artwork
Photographer Ian Digby Ovens captured John (seated to the right in the photo but appearing to the left on the front cover, shown above) and Taupin (standing to the left, on the back cover) in front of the late-nineteenth-century station, to represent the album's rural Americana concept despite the English location. Additional photos were taken from the interior of a train on the line for the album liner notes and libretto.

In August 2020, the Bluebell Railway announced that, to mark the 50th anniversary of the release of the album, it had restored the station to look as it did when the cover photo was taken, giving people an opportunity to re-create the scene in their own photos.

Reception 

The album peaked at number two on the UK Albums Chart and number five on the US Billboard 200 chart. In the US, it was certified gold in March 1971 and platinum in August 1998 by the RIAA. The album sold very quickly in the US, debuting at number 28 on Billbord's Top LPs, an unusually high debut for a new artist at the time, and reached its peak position in just four weeks.

In 2012, Tumbleweed Connection was ranked number 458 on Rolling Stone magazine's list of the 500 greatest albums of all time.

Critical reception 

Reviewing later for Allmusic, Stephen Thomas Erlewine wrote: 
"Half of the songs don't follow conventional pop song structures; instead, they flow between verses and vague choruses. These experiments are remarkably successful, primarily because Taupin's lyrics are evocative and John's melodic sense is at its best."

Robert Christgau wrote in his
1981 Record Guide: "good melodies and bad Westerns on it. Why do people believe that these latter qualify as songpoems?" (Note: There's an earlier Christgau's review of the album, written in 1970 for The Village Voice). Reviewing for Rolling Stone (Deluxe edition), David Fricke wrote: "1971’s Tumbleweed Connection needs no improvement; it is one of the best country-rock albums ever written by London cowboys."

Robert Hillburn wrote for Los Angeles Times: "Tumbleweed Connection is that near-perfect album that artists often spend a whole career trying to produce." Dave DiMartino wrote for Yahoo! Music: "A step up from the slightly more overtly commercial Elton John... Tumbleweed is beautifully recorded and filled with very fine songs... Bordering on classic status."

Track listing

Personnel 
Track numbers refer to CD and digital releases of the album.

 Elton John – lead vocals, acoustic piano (1, 3–6, 8–10), Hammond organ (8), backing vocals (10)
 Brian Dee – Hammond organ (10, 13)
 Caleb Quaye – lead guitar (1, 4, 6, 8), acoustic guitar (1, 3, 5, 6), electric guitar (5)
 Les Thatcher – acoustic guitar (2, 10), 12-string acoustic guitar (3)
 Gordon Huntley – steel guitar (3)
 Lesley Duncan – backing vocals (1, 4, 5, 7), acoustic guitar (7)
 Mike Egan – acoustic guitar (10)
 Dave Glover – bass guitar (1, 4–6)
 Herbie Flowers – bass guitar (2, 3, 10)
 Chris Laurence – acoustic bass (2, 10)
 Dee Murray – backing vocals (3, 6), bass guitar (8)
 Roger Pope – drums (1, 4–6), percussion (1)
 Barry Morgan – drums (2, 3, 10)
 Nigel Olsson – backing vocals (3, 6), drums (8)
 Robin Jones – congas (10), tambourine (10)
 Karl Jenkins – oboe (2)
 Skaila Kanga – harp (2)
 Ian Duck – harmonica (3, 4)
 Johnny Van Derek – violin (3)
 Paul Buckmaster – orchestral arrangements and conductor
 Madeline Bell – backing vocals (1, 4, 5)
 Tony Burrows – backing vocals (1, 5)
 Kay Garner – backing vocals (1, 4, 5)
 Tony Hazzard – backing vocals (1, 5)
 Dusty Springfield – backing vocals (1, 5)
 Tammi Hunt – backing vocals (4)
 Heather Wheatman – backing vocals (4)
 Yvonne Wheatman – backing vocals (4)

Production 
 Gus Dudgeon – producer
 Robin Geoffrey Cable – engineer
 Gus Skinas – editing
 Ricky Graham – digital transfers
 Greg Penny – surround mix
 Bernie Taupin – lyricist
 David Larkham – art direction, design, cover design, cover artwork, photography
 Barry Wentzell – photography
 Ian Digby-Ovens – photography
 John Tobler – liner notes

Charts

Weekly charts

Year-end charts

Certifications

References

External links

Elton John albums
1970 albums
Albums produced by Gus Dudgeon
Albums recorded at Trident Studios
Albums conducted by Paul Buckmaster
Albums arranged by Paul Buckmaster
Concept albums
DJM Records albums
Uni Records albums